Pucadelphys is an extinct genus of non-marsupial metatherian. The genus contains a single species, P. andinus. Fossils of Pucadelphys have been found in the Santa Lucía Formation in Tiupampa in Bolivia.

Description 
Pucadelphys was small and likely to have eaten insects. It had a long tail, although incomplete on the best preserved fossils. It is possible that the tail was longer than (or at least as long as) its body. 17 vertebrae were preserved, and its estimated that there was 5 to 10 additional vertebrae originally. It is regarded as partially arboreal, and partially terrestrial. It may have been social, as more than 30 specimens have been found together.

Taxonomy 
A 2016 phylogenetic analysis recovered Pucadelphys as a member of a metatherian clade including sparassodonts and other South American taxa, but not marsupials (which are instead closer to Cretaceous North American species). The phylogenetic tree from the analysis is shown below.

References

Further reading 
 Brands, S.J. (comp.) 1989–2005. Systema Naturae 2000. The Taxonomicon. Universal Taxonomic Services, Amsterdam, Holanda.
 McKenna, M.C., y Bell, S.K. (1997), Classification of Mammals Above the Species Level., Columbia University Press, New York. 0-231-11013-8. 
 Suárez Soruco, R. (2007) Bolivia y su Paleodiversidad Cuadernos del Museo Geominero, nº 8. Instituto Geológico y Minero de España, Madrid. 

Prehistoric metatherians
Paleocene mammals of South America
Tiupampan
Paleogene Bolivia
Fossils of Bolivia
Santa Lucía Formation
Fossil taxa described in 1988
Prehistoric mammal genera